The modern motto of the United States of America, as established in a 1956 law signed by President Dwight D. Eisenhower, is "In God we trust". The phrase first appeared on U.S. coins in 1864.

History 
The 1956 law was the first establishment of an official motto for the country, although E pluribus unum ("Out of many, one") was adopted by an Act of Congress in 1782 as the motto for the Seal of the United States and has been used on coins and paper money since 1795.

A phrase similar to "In God we trust" appears in the final stanza of "The Star-Spangled Banner". Written in 1814 by Francis Scott Key (and later adopted as the U.S. national anthem on March 3, 1931 by U.S. President Herbert Hoover), the song contains an early reference to a variation of the phrase: "And this be our motto: 'In God is our trust.'"

The change from "E Pluribus Unum" to "In God we trust" was generally considered uncontroversial at the time, given the rising influence of organized religion and pressures of the Cold War era in the 1950s. The 1956 law was one of several legislative actions Congress took to differentiate the United States from atheistic communism. Earlier, a 1954 act added the words "under God" to the Pledge of Allegiance. Some states also adopted mottos with religious overtones during this time, for example Ohio's "With God, all things are possible".

The constitutionality of the modern national motto has been questioned with relationship to the separation of church and state outlined in the First Amendment. In 1970, in Aronow v. United States, the United States Court of Appeals for the Ninth Circuit ruled that the motto does not violate the First Amendment to the Constitution. The United States Supreme Court has not ruled on the issue.

See also 

 List of national mottos

References 

Motto
History of religion in the United States